Upton is a surname of English origin and a rarely used given name. At the time of the British Census of 1881 Upton Surname at Forebears, the frequency of the surname Upton was highest in Sussex (6.2 times the national average), followed by Oxfordshire, Leicestershire, Staffordshire, Nottinghamshire, Warwickshire, Kent, Bedfordshire and Derbyshire.
The name Upton is a variation of Upperton and is derived from the Old English for Upper Ton, Upper Enclosure or Upper Field.

Given name

 Upton Bell (born 1937), American sports executive, sports commentator, and talk show host
 Upton Sheredine (1740–1800), Maryland jurist
 Upton Sinclair (1878–1968), American author

Surname

 Anne Upton (1892-1970), American composer and radio writer
 Arthur Upton (disambiguation), several people of this name
 Anthony F. Upton (born 1929), British historian
 B. J. Upton (born 1984 as Melvin Upton Jr.), American baseball player; older brother of Justin Upton
 Barry Upton (born 1954), British hit songwriter, arranger, musician and producer of pop music
 Caitlin Upton (born 1989), an American fashion model and beauty queen from South Carolina
 Charles Upton (poet), (born 1948), American poet, Sufi and metaphysician
 Charles H. Upton (1812–1877), nineteenth century Congressman from Virginia
 Charles W. Upton (born 1943), economist
 Clive Upton, consultant, Oxford Dictionary
 Eben Upton (born 1978), British computer engineer, inventor of Raspberry Pi
 Emory Upton (1839–1881), US army general
 Frances Upton (1904–1975), American Broadway theatre actress and comedian
 Frank Upton (born 1934), English former professional footballer and football club manager
 Fred Upton (born 1953), American politician
 Louis Upton (born 1886), American business magnate, founders of Whirlpool Corporation
 George Upton (disambiguation), multiple people
 Gordon Upton (1920–2010), Australian diplomat
 Richard Upton (Born 1967), African Surveyor
 Graham Upton, Vice-Chancellor, Oxford Brookes University
 Harriet Taylor Upton (1853–1945), American suffragette and author
 James Upton (1888–1949) British soldier awarded the Victoria Cross
 Jason Upton (born 1973), independent Christian worship leader
 John Upton (disambiguation), multiple people
 Justin Upton (born 1987), American baseball player
 Kate Upton (born 1992), American swimsuit model
 Lawrence Upton (born 1949), poet and artist
 Lee Upton (born 1953), American poet
 Mary Upton (born 1946), Irish politician
 Pat Upton (politician) (1944–1999), Irish veterinarian and senior Labour Party politician
 Simon Upton (born 1958), New Zealand politician
 Solomon Upton (1891–1972), English footballer
 Steve Upton (born 1946), Wishbone Ash drummer
 Sue Upton (born 1954), British comic actress and dancer
 Robert Upton (1884–1972), American Congressman
 Róisín Upton (born 1994), Ireland field hockey
 William Upton (cricketer) (1804–1867), English cricketer
 William W. Upton (1817–1896), Oregon judge and U.S. Treasury comptroller
 Winslow Upton (1853–1914), American astronomer

Fictional characters 
 Dean Upton, from the British soap opera Coronation Street

Surnames
English-language surnames
Surnames of English origin
Surnames of British Isles origin